The Yuribey Bridge (Russian: мост через Юрибей) is a  railway bridge on the Obskaya–Bovanenkovo Line. The bridge was completed in 2009. It is the longest bridge above the Arctic Circle.

The bridge was constructed by Gazprom in a harsh environment including the need to build on permafrost, which required an innovative approach to the construction technique and bridge design. The bridge has to be much longer than the river width, because on permafrost, the water from melting snow does not sink into the ground, so the spring flows get quite strong.

Construction of bridge
According to media reports, the bridge was built in 349 days - in a very short timeline for such structures. In April 2009, construction of the bridge was completed, and June 4, 2009 the bridge passed the first high-ranking passengers - the presidential envoy in the Urals Federal District Nikolai Vinnichenko, Governor of Yamal Jury Neyolov, CEO Gazpromtrans Vyacheslav Tyurin . The opening of the bridge allowed to complete the construction of the railway to the Bovanenkovo and begin development of the Bovanenkovo oil and gas condensate field.
The bridge consists of 107 typical spans, each 34.2 meters long, and 2 through trusses, each 110 meters long. The spans and trusses are supported by 110 bridge arms made of the metal pipes 1.2–2.4 meters in diameter filled with reinforced concrete. To ensure the stability of the pillars in the permafrost were drilled hole depth of 20–40 meters. total weight exceeds 30,000 tons, service life – 100 years.

References

External links
Description of whole line

Railway bridges in Russia
Bridges completed in 2009
Rail transport in Yamalo-Nenets Autonomous Okrug
Buildings and structures in Yamalo-Nenets Autonomous Okrug